Sonhos de Peixe is a 2006 film by Kirill Mikhanovsky. It premiered on May 21, 2006 in the International Critic's Week competition (La Semaine de la Critique) at the 2006 Cannes Film Festival.

Plot summary
In a village on the northeastern coast of Brazil, Jusce, 17, scrapes a living by diving 30 meters, with rudimentary equipment, for lobster. His "prize" at the end of a long day of risky work is sitting close to Ana, who lives with her mother and young daughter, as she savors the drama of urban sophisticates on her favorite soap opera.

Ana dreams of leaving the village to see the world. Jusce is content with the life he leads. The other fishermen, friends of Jusce's dead father, help him to buy and fit out his own fishing boat. One day an old friend, Rogério, returns from the big city to work giving dune buggy rides along the coast. The day Rogério gives Jusce a ride to Ana's place marks the beginning of their rivalry for Ana's attention. Jusce has to reinvent himself in order not to lose Ana to the adventurous life style of Rogério.

Cast
José Maria Alves as Jusce
Rubia Rafaelle as Ana
Phellipe Haagensen as Rogério
Chico Díaz as João
Yves Hoffer as Gunther Bass

Awards
Sonhos de Peixe has won three film awards:
 Cannes Film Festival: Prix Regards Jeune (2006)
 Miami Film Festival: Special Jury Award (2007)
 Sofia International Film Festival: Special Jury Award (2007)

External links
 

2006 films
2006 drama films
2000s Portuguese-language films
Brazilian independent films
Films shot in Rio Grande do Norte
2006 independent films